The MGen. Nathanael Greene-class large coastal tugs are powered watercraft in the United States Army. They are a class of large tugs built for US Army service, primarily intended to assist in docking of transports.

Ships
 USAV MGen Nathanael Greene (LT-801) (Auctioned off)
 USAV MGen Henry Knox (LT-802)
 USAV MGen Anthony Wayne (LT-803)
 USAV BGen Zebulon Pike (LT-804)
 
 USAV COL Seth Warner (LT-806)
 USAV SgM John Champe (LT-807) (planned, never built)
 USAV MGen Jacob Brown (LT-808) (planned, never built)

References

External links
MGen. Nathanael Greene class large coastal tugs (6 ships)
New US Army Tug Boat

Ships of the United States Army
 
Tugboats of the United States
Auxiliary tugboat classes